Agriphila tristella, the common grass-veneer, is a species of moth of the family Crambidae found in Europe and Asia.

Distribution and habitat
Agriphila tristella is found in grassy habitats. It occurs across Europe including the British Islands, as well as in Asia, including in Iran, north-western India, and Pakistan. Its type locality is in Austria.

Behaviour
In the UK, the moth flies from June to September. It is nocturnal and attracted to light.

The larvae feed on various grasses, such as Poa and Deschampsia species.

Description

Handbook of British Lepidoptera
The following description of Agriphila tristella was published in Edward Meyrick's 1895 A Handbook of British Lepidoptera:

References

External links
 
 Lepiforum.de

Crambini
Moths of Asia
Moths of Europe
Moths described in 1775
Taxa named by Michael Denis
Taxa named by Ignaz Schiffermüller